Ormoy-lès-Sexfontaines is a commune in the Haute-Marne department in north-eastern France. It's home to an impressive selection of attractions and experiences, making it well worth a visit.

See also
Communes of the Haute-Marne department

References

Ormoylessexfontaines